Criticism in the Wilderness: The Study of Literature Today is a 1980 book by literary critic Geoffrey Hartman. In the book, Hartman argues for literary criticism to be taken as seriously as a form of creative literature in its own right, and he discusses the difficulties that literature professors face in the contemporary American university.

Overview

Hartman contends that works like Jacques Derrida's Glas, Norman O. Brown's Closing Time, Thomas Carlyle's Sartor Resartus, and Samuel Taylor Coleridge's Biographia Literaria represent a current of literary criticism that is as creative and idiosyncratic as the canonical works that critics have historically studied and written about.

Hartman also examines the professional dilemmas of literature professors, who despite their subversive sympathies, must accept that their college teaching places them in the position of educating students whose literary education polishes them to take leadership roles in power networks that are opposed to the values the professors hope to inculcate.

A second edition of the book, with a foreword by Hayden White, was published by Yale University Press in 2007.

Reception

Criticism in the Wilderness was widely reviewed in the academic press, and received largely positive and admiring assessments.

Harriet Ritvo, writing in The Threepenny Review, gave high praise for the book:

Hartman flatly rejects the distinction between literature and criticism. Instead, he asserts that both are kinds of "writing." Throughout the volume, he alternates between analysis or "reading" of conventionally literary works and of criticism with no apparent alteration of method: in one chapter, for example, he discusses his colleague Harold Bloom right alongside Thomas Carlyle. He acknowledges that most criticism is secondary in the sense that it is about other writing, but he firmly resists the inference that this necessarily makes it inferior. As a result, reading—the work of critics—becomes a heroically strenuous activity. Instead of a respectful effort to divine and interpret the author's intentions, it is a struggle between author and reader-critic for control of the work. The results include greatly expanded opportunities for critical pyrotechnics—and some of Hartman's are breathtaking.

Alexander Argyros and Jerry Aline Flieger reviewed Criticism in the Wilderness in Diacritics, and were positive in their assessment. They stated: "Hartman's work is above all, a polemics of style, the stylist's manifesto, an assertion of the critic's right to a literary style, along with the corollary repudiation of the dream of a 'pure' language 'that no longer mixes images and meanings.'"

James Mall, writing in The Journal of Aesthetics and Art Criticism, questioned why Hartman did not write the kind of context-breaking critical work that Criticism in the Wilderness celebrates: "Hartman's energetic plea for the right to engage in a more personal, 'creative criticism' is needless. The form of writing he defends is certainly not revolutionary, as his own comments on Carlyle, Emerson, Valery, Derrida, and Bloom indicate. Why, then, has he not written the kind of book he claims to wish to write?"

Richard Boyd Hauck, reviewing Criticism in the Wilderness in Modern Fiction Studies, wrote that "the advanced student can find some rare things here: an essay on literary commentary as literature, an analysis of the psychology of the critic, a chapter on the history of practical criticism, an admiring defense against (not attack upon) T. S. Eliot, an interesting discussion of how Walter Benjamin took criticism out of the world of art into 'all sectors of daily life,' and some expansions upon Harold Bloom's 'insights.'"

A.D. Nuttall, writing in The Modern Language Review, said: "Professor Hartman knows a great deal and writes very elegantly, with a sort of brilliant vagueness which arises, curiously enough, from firm critical principle. The principle is the Romantic theorem that literature is a mystery which is profaned by explanation or paraphrase."

Susan Handelman, reviewing the book in The Wordsworth Circle, gave the following appraisal: "Hartman's book is, above all, a passionate reassertion of the authority and creativity of the critic, an argument for a broad 'philosophical criticism,' whose relation to art is, in his words, 'symbiotic' not 'parasitic.'"

Peter Rudnytsky in World Literature Today wrote that Criticism in the Wilderness, as "an unqualified triumph both of speculation and close reading, is itself that 'demonstration of freedom' which, according to Geoffrey Hartman, each 'work of art' and 'work of reading' may potentially be. Succeeding brilliantly in the critic's double task of responding to 'the extraordinary language-event' while yet maintaining 'a prose of the center,' Hartman returns us 'to a larger and darker view of art as mental charm, war, and purgation.'"

Daniel Hughes in MLN wrote that "[o]ne of the strengths of Hartman's work has always been the depth of his understanding and the generosity of his response to other critics. He works through and around them, saving what suits him and even praising what he cannot accept...."

Richard Levin reviewed Criticism in the Wilderness in Modern Philology, and wrote that "[i]t is in many respects a very impressive achievement—prodigiously learned, deeply engaged, charged with energy and excitement, and written in a finely honed and often eloquent style. It is also a very difficult book which makes few concessions to its readers."

Sarah Lawall, reviewing the book in Comparative Literature, wrote that "it is clear from Criticism in the Wilderness that Hartman (especially in the three 'polemical pieces' at the end) sees himself as the herald of a contemporary humanistic re-vision blending analytical and creative consciousness, the English-American and continental European heritage."

Lawall went on to say that 
the great merit of this study is the way it moves from illustrating the contingent nature of reading (the modeled "work of reading") to an understanding of the creative consciousness as that which gives us identity, situates us in time and culture. Hartman's reading itself is exemplary: that is, it is an example of a truly responsive reading of literary and critical texts related to the problem of individual human understanding."

Shuli Barzilai and Morton Bloomfield in New Literary History wrote that "[t]he act of writing itself, the 'question of critical style,' is one of the main polemical concerns of Geoffrey Hartman's Criticism in the Wilderness. In his essays Hartman repeatedly inveighs not only against the subordination of criticism to literature, but also against the tedium of a stylistic decorum which reduces criticism to the level of formal conversation."

See also
 Geoffrey Hartman
 Yale school

References

Sources

 
 
 
 

1980 non-fiction books
English-language books
Books of literary criticism